Ferenc Erkel (November 7, 1810June 15, 1893) was a Hungarian composer, conductor and pianist. He was the father of Hungarian grand opera, written mainly on historical themes, which are still often performed in Hungary. He also composed the music of "Himnusz", the national anthem of Hungary, which was adopted in 1844. He died in Budapest.

Biography
Erkel was born in Gyula to a Danube Swabian family, a son of Joseph Erkel who was a musician. His mother was the Hungarian Klára Ruttkay. The libretti of his first three operas were written by Béni Egressy. Beside his operas, for which he is best known, he wrote pieces for piano and chorus, and a majestic Festival Overture. He acquainted Hector Berlioz with the tune of the Rákóczi March, which Berlioz used in The Damnation of Faust.

He headed the Budapest Philharmonic Orchestra (founded in 1853). He was also the director and piano teacher of the Hungarian Academy of Music until 1886. The Hungarian State Opera House in Budapest was opened in 1884, of which he was the musical director.

In 1839, he married Adél Adlers. Four of his sons participated in the composing of his later operas: Gyula (July 4, 1842, PestMarch 22, 1909, Újpest), Elek (November 2, 1843, PestJune 10, 1893, Budapest), László (April 9, 1844, PestDecember 3, 1896, Pozsony / Bratislava) and Sándor (January 2, 1846, PestOctober 14, 1900, Békéscsaba).

In popular culture
Erkel was an internationally acknowledged chess player as well, and a founder of Pesti Sakk-kör (Budapest Chess Club).
A department of the Opera House was established in 1911 in Budapest which also performs operas, named Erkel Színház (Erkel Theatre) since 1953.
He was commemorated on gold and silver coins issued by the Hungarian National Bank for the 200th anniversary of his birth.

Operas

 Bátori Mária (1840, two acts; Mária Bátori is the lover of László, son of Coloman of Hungary)
 Hunyadi László (1844, three acts)
 Erzsébet (1857, three acts, only the second is by Erkel)
 Bánk bán (1861, three acts; Bánk bán is a palatine of Andrew II) – this opera is often thought of as the national opera of Hungary
 Sarolta (1862, three acts)
 Dózsa György (1867, five acts)
 Brankovics György (1874, four acts)
 Névtelen hősök (1880, "Nameless heroes", four acts)
 István király (1885, "King Stephen", four acts)
 Kemény Simon (remained in fragments; planned to be of three acts)

See also
 Hungarian opera

References

External links

 
 Budapest Philharmonic Orchestra 
 Opera.hu 
 Erkel playing chess
 
 

1810 births
1893 deaths
19th-century classical composers
19th-century classical pianists
19th-century Hungarian musicians
19th-century conductors (music)
Burials at Kerepesi Cemetery
Danube-Swabian people
Hungarian classical composers
Hungarian classical pianists
Hungarian conductors (music)
Hungarian-German people
Hungarian male classical composers
Hungarian music educators
Hungarian opera composers
Hungarian Romantic composers
Male classical pianists
Male conductors (music)
Male opera composers
National anthem writers
People from Gyula